Rothenberger is a surname. Notable people with the surname include:

Anneliese Rothenberger (1924–2010), German operatic soprano
Curt Rothenberger (1896–1959), German jurist
Gonnelien Rothenberger (born 1968), Dutch equestrian 
Sven Rothenberger (born 1966), German equestrian